SMS Tegetthoff was an ironclad warship of the Austro-Hungarian Navy. She was built by the Stabilimento Tecnico Triestino shipyard in Trieste, between April 1876 and October 1881. She was armed with a main battery of six  guns mounted in a central-battery. The ship had a limited career, and did not see action. In 1897, she was reduced to a guard ship in Pola, and in 1912 she was renamed Mars. She served as a training ship after 1917, and after the end of World War I, she was surrendered as a war prize to Italy, which sold her for scrapping in 1920.

Design
Tegetthoff was a central battery ship designed by Chief Engineer Josef von Romako. The ship's namesake, Admiral Wilhelm von Tegetthoff, victor of the Battle of Lissa, had proposed building four new ironclads. These were to be completed by 1878, but poor economic conditions in the early 1870s forced the Austro-Hungarian government to cut back the naval budget. Admiral Friedrich von Pöck, who succeeded Tegetthoff as the head of naval administration, had attempted to secure funding for two new ships, to be named Tegetthoff and Erzherzog Karl from 1871. Pöck finally succeeded in convincing parliament to allocate funds for the first ship in 1875. He continued to try to convince the parliament to build a sister ship for Tegetthoff until 1880, without success. Austro-Hungarian industry was incapable of supporting the construction of the ship, and significant components had to be ordered from foreign manufacturers, including guns from Germany and armor plating from Britain.

The arrangement of the main battery was altered considerably; whereas the earlier ships had carried guns on two decks, Tegetthoff carried hers on a single deck, and the gun ports were arranged in such a way that the guns could be trained side to side without having to move them to another port. The naval historian R. F. Scheltema de Heere considers Tegetthoff to be "the only sensible casemate ship ever built", which "must be considered a stroke of genius."

General characteristics

As was standard for capital ships of the period, Tegetthoff was fitted with a pronounced ram bow. She had short forecastle and sterncastle decks. Tegetthoff was the first ship in the Austrian Navy to be built with an all-steel hull, which allowed for a considerable savings in weight. Steering was controlled with a single rudder, from an unprotected position atop the conning tower or from a battle conning position below decks, behind the ship's heavy side armor. The ship's crew numbered 525 officers and men.

Steam was provided by nine fire-tube boilers with three fireboxes apiece that were vented through a pair of funnels on the centerline amidships. She was initially fitted with a three-masted sailing rig, though this was removed during the modernization, and two heavy fighting masts were installed in its place.

Armament and armor

Tegetthoff was initially equipped with a main battery of six  L/18 breech-loading guns manufactured by Krupp. These guns were mounted in a central battery amidships, and were intended to be used during pursuit and ramming attempts. Each gun had a range of elevation from -5° to +8.25°, and the forward guns could fire directly ahead. The aft guns could be fired directly astern, while the center pair had more limited firing arcs. The ammunition magazine was located directly below the main battery. The ship also carried six  L/24 breech-loaders, two  L/15 breech-loaders, and four  quick-firing (QF) guns. All of these guns were carried in individual pivot mounts on the upper deck, and in the case of the 47 mm guns, in fighting tops on the masts.

Modifications
In the mid-1890s, Tegetthoff was extensively modernized. Her boilers were replaced with eight new Scotch marine boilers. After her reconstruction in the early 1890s, her propulsion system was replaced with a pair of 3-cylinder triple expansion engines built by the German firm Schichau-Werke. Her crew was increased to between 568 and 575. Also during the modernization, the main battery was replaced with  L/35 C/86 guns from Krupp. The secondary guns now consisted of five  L/35 QF guns, two  L/18 guns, nine 47 mm L/44 QF guns, six 47 mm L/33 machine guns, and a pair of  machine guns. Tegetthoff was also equipped with two  torpedo tubes, one in the bow and one in the stern.

Service history

Tegetthoff was laid down on 1 April 1876 at the Stabilimento Tecnico Triestino shipyard in Trieste. The ship was launched on 15 October 1878, and completed in 1881. Supervision of the ship's construction was entrusted to the engineer Carl Tullinger, who had previously been sent to Amsterdam to observe the ship model basin that had been built there, the second example to be built in the world. According to Lawrence Sondhaus, Tegetthoff began her sea trials in October 1881, but Scheltema de Heere, citing records from the Austrian archives, provides a date of 5 August 1882 as the beginning of her trials. The ship was ready for commissioning in September 1882; Kaiser Franz Joseph attended the commissioning of the ship in Pola. Financial difficulties had again delayed the ship's completion; the parliament finally voted to allocate funds to finish the ship in November 1881. At the time, she was the largest and most powerful ship in the Austro-Hungarian fleet, and she would keep that distinction until after the turn of the century. She was, nevertheless, a political compromise, and was much smaller than foreign casemate ships, particularly British and French vessels.

Tegetthoffs career was rather limited, in large part due to significant problems with her engines. For the first decade of her career, she was assigned to the Active Squadron, and her crew could only keep her engines fully operational in the years 1883, 1887, and 1888. This was the largest squadron of the Austro-Hungarian Navy that had operated outside the Adriatic. In June and July 1889, Tegetthoff participated in fleet training exercises, which also included the ironclads Custoza, Kaiser Max, Prinz Eugen, and Don Juan d'Austria.

In 1893–1894, she was modernized and had her propulsion system updated and her armament was replaced with newer guns. Her engines were replaced with more reliable models manufactured by the German firm Schichau-Werke. Admiral Maximilian Daublebsky von Sterneck had replaced Pöck, and unable to secure funding for capital ships, instead tried to modernize the Austro-Hungarian fleet by embracing the Jeune École doctrine.

After 1897 she was used as a guard ship in Pola. During the summer maneuvers of June 1901, she served in the reserve squadron. The other major ships in the squadron included the new armored cruiser  and the protected cruiser . In 1912 Tegetthoff was renamed Mars, so that her original name could be used on a new battleship launched that year. She remained in service as a guard ship after the outbreak of World War I in August 1914. In 1917, she was used as a school ship for midshipmen, and the following year she was reduced to a hulk. Following the end of World War I, the ship was surrendered to Italy, where she was broken up by 1920.

Footnotes

Notes

Citations

References
 
 
 
 
 
 
 

Ships built in Trieste
1878 ships
Ironclad warships of the Austro-Hungarian Navy